The Nomenclature of Territorial Units for Statistics (NUTS) is a geocode standard for referencing the subdivisions of the Czech Republic for statistical purposes. The standard is developed and regulated by the European Union. The NUTS standard is instrumental in delivering the European Union's Structural Funds. The NUTS code for the Czech Republic is CZ and a hierarchy of three levels is established by Eurostat. Below these is a further levels of geographic organisation - the local administrative unit (LAU). In the Czech Republic, the LAU 1 is  districts and the LAU 2 is municipalities.

Overall

NUTS codes

In the 2003 version, the Vysočina Region was coded CZ061, and the South Moravian Region was coded CZ062.

Local administrative units

Below the NUTS levels, the two LAU (Local Administrative Units) levels are:

The LAU codes of the Czech Republic can be downloaded here: ''

See also
List of Czech regions by Human Development Index
Subdivisions of the Czech Republic
 ISO 3166-2 codes of the Czech Republic
 FIPS region codes of the Czech Republic

References

Sources
 Hierarchical list of the Nomenclature of territorial units for statistics - NUTS and the Statistical regions of Europe
 Overview map of EU Countries - NUTS level 1
 Correspondence between the NUTS levels and the national administrative units
 List of current NUTS codes
 Download current NUTS codes (ODS format)
 Regions of the Czech Republic, Statoids.com
 Districts of the Czech Republic, Statoids.com

External links
 NUTS reference of the Czech Republic
 NUTS of municipalities

Czech Republic
Nuts